The naming of Qantas aircraft has followed various themes since 1926.

 1926 de Havilland DH.50 – figures from Greek mythology – Iris, Perseus, Pegasus, Atalanta, Hermes, and Hippomenes
 1926 de Havilland DH.9 – figure from Greek mythology – Ion	
 1929 de Havilland DH.61 – figures from Greek mythology – Apollo, Diana, Hermes and Athena 	
 1938 Short Empire C Class Flying boat – mainly Australian coastal place names – Carpentaria, Coorong, Cooee, Coolangatta, Coogee and Corio; four aircraft (Clifton, Camilla, Coriolanus, and Calypso) transferred from British Overseas Airways Corporation during World War II. 	
 1943 Consolidated PBY Catalina – stars – Rigel Star, Spica Star, Altair Star, Vega Star, Antares Star. 	
 1947 Lockheed L-749 Constellation – Australian aviation personalities – Ross Smith, Lawrence Hargrave, Harry Hawker, Charles Kingsford Smith, Bert Hinkler and Horace Brinsmead.
 1949 Douglas DC-4 – "Trader" theme – Pacific Trader, Norfolk Trader, New Guinea Trader, Hong Kong Trader, Malayan Trader, Australian Trader, Philippine Trader. 	
 1951 Short Sandringham S.25 Flying Boat – "Pacific" theme – Pacific Warrior, Pacific Chieftain, Pacific Voyager and Pacific Explorer.
 1954 Lockheed L-1049 Super Constellation – "Southern" theme – Southern Aurora, Southern Boomerang, Southern Breeze, Southern Constellation, Southern Dawn, Southern Horizon, Southern Melody, Southern Mist, Southern Moon, Southern Prodigal, Southern Sea, Southern Sky, Southern Spray, Southern Star, Southern Sun, Southern Tide, Southern Wave, Southern Wind and Southern Zephyr. Also, the Super Constellation L-1049F restored by the Historical Aircraft Restoration Society (HARS) was named "Southern Preservation", in the theme of the original aircraft.
 1958 de Havilland Canada DHC-3 Otter – New Guinea theme – Kikori (Papua), Kokopo (New Britain), Kieta (Bougainville), and Kerowagi (New Guinea).	
 1959 Lockheed L-188 Electra – "Pacific" theme – Pacific Electra, Pacific Explorer, Pacific Endeavour and Pacific Enterprise 	
 1959 Boeing 707-138 – Australian cities, mainly capital cities – City of Canberra, City of Sydney, City of Melbourne, City of Brisbane, City of Perth, City of Adelaide, City of Hobart, City of Darwin, Winton, Longreach, City of Newcastle, City of Geelong and City of Launceston.	 
 1965 Boeing 707-338 – Australian cities – City of Parramatta, City of Townsville, Alice Springs, City of Ballarat, City of Wollongong, Kalgoorlie, City of Bendigo, and so on.	

City names continued on all Qantas ordered and delivered Boeing 747, Boeing 747SP and Boeing 767 aircraft until 2008. 	 
 
 
 1989 Boeing 747-400 – in addition to their usual city names, all Boeing 747-400 aircraft carry the word "Longreach" as part of the livery. This is actually a double meaning - it signifies both the "long reach" of the aircraft (i.e. they have a long range), and the town where Qantas commenced operations : Longreach, Queensland.
 In 1993 Qantas obtained a domestic route network when Australian Airlines (formerly Trans Australia Airlines) was merged into Qantas. Australian Airlines had used different naming conventions and these names were carried over. 	
 1981 Airbus A300 – Australian explorers – James Cook, John Oxley, John Forrest, William Light and John Fawkner
 1986 Boeing 737-300 – inspirational names – Courageous, Advance, Adventure, Boldness, Challenge, Daring, Enterprise, Intrepid, Progress, Success, Valiant, Victory, Resolute, Fortitude, Endeavour and Gallant	
 1990 Boeing 737-400 – birds – Kookaburra, Brolga, Eagle, Falcon, Swan, Heron, Ibis, Swift, Kestrel, Egret, Lorikeet, Petrel, Bellbird, Cockatiel, Jabiru, Kingfisher and Currawong Also, the final few Boeing 737-400s delivered were named as per the 737-300 convention  – Sharing, Trust, Integrity and Tenacity.
 1993 – Aboriginal Art – six aircraft have been painted with five different Aboriginal liveries and named accordingly; initially to celebrate the 1993 International observance of International Year for the World's Indigenous People. There has been some criticism of Qantas for using Indigenous names and imagery as Indigenous Australians are under-represented in its workforce.
Wunala Dreaming (Boeing 747-400  and Boeing 747-400ER after retirement of OJB) (OJB was repainted into regular Qantas livery) The design was by John Moriarty and his wife Ros (Balarinji Designs); the design features the spirits of Indigenous Australians in the form of kangaroos travelling through the red desert landscape. VH-OEJ was repainted back into the standard Qantas livery in 2012. Wunala means kangaroo.
Nalanji Dreaming (Boeing 747-300 ) was also painted to a design by John and Ros Moriarty and was launched in 1995. The aircraft has been retired in 2008.
Yananyi Dreaming (Boeing 737-800 ) launched in 2002; the artwork was by Rene Kulitja, a Pitjitjantjarra woman from Mutitjulu, near Uluru. repainted into corporate livery - September 2014.
Mendoowoorrji  (Boeing 737-800 ) was designed by John and Ros Moriarty based on the 2005 painting 'Medicine Pocket' by West Australian Aboriginal artist Paddy Bedford and launched in November 2013.
Emily Kame Kngwarreye (Boeing 787 Dreamliner ) was inspired by the 1991 artwork 'Yam Dreaming', painted by the late artist, Emily Kame Kngwarreye. The painting captures the essence of the yam plant, an important symbol in Emily's Dreamtime story, and an important food source in her home region of Utopia, 230 kilometres north east of Alice Springs.
 2008 Airbus A380 – Australian Aviation Pioneers – Nancy-Bird Walton, Hudson Fysh, Paul McGinness, Fergus McMaster, Lawrence Hargrave, Charles Kingsford Smith, Charles Ulm, Reginald Ansett, David Warren, Bert Hinkler, John and Reginald Duigan, and Phyllis Arnott. Names were also announced for the eight orders that were eventually cancelled. These were planned to be Keith Macpherson Smith and Ross Macpherson Smith, Lester Brain, Lores Bonney, Norman Brearley, P G Taylor, Scotty Allan, John Flynn and Gaby Kennard.
 2014 Boeing 737-800 – Aircraft in Historical Qantas Livery – James Strong and Retro Roo II. The first aircraft appears in the Qantas 1971 to 1984 livery and the second aircraft appears in Qantas' first jet livery used from 1959 to 1961.
 2017 Boeing 787-9 – Australiana – Great Barrier Reef, Boomerang, Skippy, Waltzing Matilda, Uluru, Great Southern Land, Quokka, and ''Dreamtime.

References 

Qantas